Streptomyces canus is a bacterium species from the genus of Streptomyces which has been isolated from soil in the US. Streptomyces canus produces resistomycin, tetracenomycin D, amphomycin, aspartocin D and aspartocin E.

See also 
 List of Streptomyces species

References

Further reading

External links
Type strain of Streptomyces canus at BacDive – the Bacterial Diversity Metadatabase

canus
Bacteria described in 1953